Julie Cohen (nickname Jewels) is an American actress, songwriter, singer and casting director. She is from New York City. She started her acting career from the stages of Broadway and later at The High School of Performing Arts near Times Square. Cohen is known for Once Upon a Time in America (1984), Thanksgiving in the Land of Oz (1980) and Streetwalkin (1985). She is the winner of the Cinema for Peace Women's Empowerment Award of 2019.  Presently she lives in Topanga Canyon, California. She used to write songs for her band City Fritter. City Fritter was disbanded in 2012, she and her husband Johnny changed the band's name to Jewels and Johnny Nation and she writes and sings for this band mainly around her hometown. Cohen studied improvisation at Second City in Chicago.

Filmography

References

Year of birth missing (living people)
Actresses from New York City
Musicians from New York City
Living people
Fiorello H. LaGuardia High School alumni
21st-century American women